Asia Muhammad and Maria Sanchez were the defending champions, but Muhammad chose not to participate. Sanchez partnered Johanna Konta and successfully defended her title, defeating Raluca Olaru and Anna Tatishvili in the final, 7–6(7–5), 6–4.

Seeds

Draw

References 
 Draw

Odlum Brown Vancouver Open
Vancouver Open